"Betrayed" is a song recorded by American rapper Lil Xan, released for digital download on July 7, 2017. The single peaked at number 64 on the US Billboard Hot 100.

Background
The song focuses on Lil Xan's personal struggle with the use of Xanax. On the track, Xan talks about past relationships, his struggle with drug abuse, and the adverse effects of Xanax. Lil Xan explained what happened the day that he was inspired to write it, saying that, "I was with my homie Steven and we recorded out of a really ghetto garage. 'Slingshot,' 'Betrayed,' all those songs were recorded in a ghetto, bougie garage. It's just a vibe, you know? The writing is easy there. It just comes naturally. In bigger studios, I can't really catch a vibe like that. I'm not gonna lie, I probably wrote that song in 20 minutes, but I knew when I wrote it this was something different that people haven't heard from me yet. I went in, laid it down and everybody was fucking with it heavy, so it was insane."

Though Leanos still uses the moniker "Lil Xan", he also raises awareness for the problems with the drug, explaining his thoughts in an interview. "People call me a poser all the time. They're like, 'You don't do Xans. You're Lil Xan and you don't do Xans?' I was painfully addicted to Xanax for like two years of my life, so anybody trying to tell me I'm a poser, can shut the fuck up. Because I know what it's like to be addicted to that. And I was lucky enough to get off of that shit. A lot of rappers don't really be talking about not doing drugs. The opposite way. It's refreshing."

Music video
The official music video was released on August 28, 2017 on Tvbois's YouTube channel. The music video has over 292 million views on Lyrical Lemonade and has 165 million views on his Vevo as of October 2022.

Remix
The song's official remix, released on March 15, 2018, includes guest verses from Yo Gotti and Rich the Kid, and a new verse by Leanos.

Charts

Weekly charts

Year-end charts

Certifications

References

2017 songs
2017 singles
Lil Xan songs
Songs about drugs
Music videos directed by Cole Bennett